Legislative election were held in Russia on 17 December 1995. At stake were the 450 seats in the State Duma (Gosudarstvennaya Duma), the lower house of the Federal Assembly.

Electoral system
The election law adopted for the 1995 election was similar to that adopted for the 1993 election, with some minor modifications. First, to secure a place on the proportional representation ballot, parties had to have registered with the Ministry of Justice no later than six months before the election, and the number of signatures they had to gather rose from 100,000 to 200,000. Second, invalid votes were now included in the calculation of the 5.0 percent threshold. Third, on the single-member district ballot, party endorsements of candidates were indicated.

Political blocs

Campaign
Out of the forty three parties and coalitions contesting the elections, only four cleared the 5% threshold to qualify for the proportional seats.

Pro-Government parties
Our Home – Russia had weightier resources and soon acquired the nickname of "party of power" for its reliance on elite political and economic office holders. It was also referred to as "Our Home Is Gazprom" for its close ties to Gazprom's substantial financial resources. Most of the cabinet ministers joined the bloc, and a number of business leaders and regional political elites affiliated with it. However, almost no other parties entered it, and many SMD candidates who had initially affiliated with the party soon left it. One of the early parties to enter the bloc, Sergei Shakhrai's Party of Russian Unity and Accord, also deserted it in August. The party program called for "stability and development, democracy and patriotism, confidence and order" as well as "pragmatism" and "a civilized market". Other proposals were contradictory as the party proposed, among other things, to encourage foreign investment while protecting Russian manufacturers, and to promote agricultural reform while regulating land ownership.

In the election, the Our Home Is Russia bloc took 10.1% of the vote, enough to form a faction in the State Duma but not enough to serve as a dominant or pivotal force in parliament or
in the regions. At its peak, the party claimed the membership of around one third of Russia's governors. However, both the center and regional elites made only ephemeral commitments to Our Home is Russia.

Opposition parties
As a result of these elections, the Communists and their satellites, the Agrarians and other left-wing deputies, controlled a little less than the half of the seats. The populist LDPR occasionally sided with the left majority, but often supported the government. As in the previous Duma, the parliamentary groups of independent deputies had a significant influence on the balance of power in the parliament.

On January 17, 1996 a Communist, Gennady Seleznyov, was elected the Speaker of the Duma.

Results

Parliamentary groups

References

Legislative elections in Russia
Legislative
Legislative
Russia
Russia
2nd State Duma of the Russian Federation